The 1908 Saint Louis Blue and White football team was an American football team that represented Saint Louis University as an independent during the 1908 college football season. In its third and final season under head coach Eddie Cochems, the team compiled a 6–2–2 record and outscored opponents by a total of 119 to 36. The team played its home games at Sportsman's Park in St. Louis.

Schedule

References

Saint Louis
Saint Louis Billikens football seasons
Saint Louis Blue and White football